Rima Abdelli (born 24 February 1988 in Madanin) is a Tunisian Paralympic athlete of short stature and she competes in F40-classification events. She represented Tunisia at the 2016 Summer Paralympics held in Rio de Janeiro, Brazil and she won the silver medal in the women's shot put F40 event. In 2019, she qualified to represent Tunisia at the 2020 Summer Paralympics in Tokyo, Japan.

At the 2015 World Championships held in Doha, Qatar, she won the bronze medal in the women's shot put F40 event. Two years later, at the 2017 World Championships held in London, United Kingdom, she set a new personal best of 7.57m in the same event and she won the gold medal. At the 2019 World Championships held in Dubai, United Arab Emirates, she finished in 4th place in this event with a distance of 7.79m. At the 2020 Summer Paralympics, she placed fifth in the women's shot put F40 event.

References

External links 
 
 

Living people
1988 births
People from Medenine Governorate
Tunisian female shot putters
Paralympic athletes of Tunisia
Paralympic silver medalists for Tunisia
Paralympic medalists in athletics (track and field)
Athletes (track and field) at the 2016 Summer Paralympics
Athletes (track and field) at the 2020 Summer Paralympics
Medalists at the 2016 Summer Paralympics
Competitors in athletics with dwarfism
21st-century Tunisian women